The 1949 South American Championships in Athletics  were held in the Peruvian capital, Lima, between 16 and 24 April.

Medal summary

Men's events

Women's events

Medal table

External links
 Men Results – GBR Athletics
 Women Results – GBR Athletics
 Medallists

S
South American Championships in Athletics
Sports competitions in Lima
International athletics competitions hosted by Peru
1949 in South American sport
1949 in Peruvian sport